Cooranbong is a town in a suburb of the City of Lake Macquarie, Greater Newcastle in New South Wales, Australia, west of the town of Morisset off the Sydney-Newcastle Freeway. Cooranbong is surrounded by the Watagans National Park.

The town's name is derived from the Aboriginal word "Kour-an-bong", meaning "rocky bottom creek" or "water over rocks".

History 

The Aboriginal people, in this area, the Awabakal, were the first people of this land.

Prior to settlement and development of the area now known as Cooranbong, lived people who identify as part of the Awabakal group. It is unknown as to how long the people lived collectively as a single group and the nature of their interactions through peace and conflict with other people not of their own kin.

The first modern settler was Lieutenant Percy Simpson, who received a  land grant from the government and was assigned six convicts who cleared the land, grazed cattle and built a homestead near Dora Creek. Although Simpson only stayed there for two years, one of his convicts, Moses Carroll, became a stockman in the area, eventually becoming the area's police constable. The Robertson Land Act of 1861 allowed the town to grow, encouraging the construction of a Catholic church and later, a school, police station and courthouse (1873), a post office (1881) and an Anglican church. Timber cutting was the primary economic activity, during the 1880s the population reached 700.When the railway was built from Sydney to Newcastle in the 1880s, the line passed around 5 km east of the town centre. The station and associated settlement were originally labelled as Cooranbong but later became known as Morisset. This was devastating to the local economy in conjunction with the significant economic depression occurring in the colony. Consequently, the population declined to 206 people by 1891. This economic depression continued until the Seventh-day Adventist Church bought  on the northern bank of Dora Creek where they built Avondale School for Christian Workers (1897) and Sanitarium Health Food Company (1909).

Present day 
The Avondale Estate is a Seventh-day Adventist owned estate opposite the Cooranbong shops.  The estate is home to Avondale University, a Seventh-day Adventist tertiary education institution, the Sanitarium Health and Wellbeing Company, Avondale College Church, Avondale Memorial Church, a disused dairy farm and Avondale Retirement Village. A number of Avondale University students and staff also live on the estate in off-campus housing.

There is also St Patrick's & St Brigid's Catholic Church, a small church built in 1906 to replace the original 1861 structure. The oldest headstone in its cemetery dates to 1862.

South Sea Islands Museum

The South Sea Islands Museum is located at 27 Avondale Road in a historic house adjacent to the Sunnyside Historical Home built and occupied by Ellen G. White. The museum contains a collection of historic South Sea Island artefacts gathered by Seventh-day Adventist missionaries during their work on Pitcairn Islands, Cook Islands, Samoa, Tonga, Fiji, the New Hebrides (now Vanuatu), the Solomon Islands, Papua New Guinea, New Caledonia and Kiribati. Its centerpiece is an enormous war canoe. The records of the missionaries' work in Australia and in the South Sea Island region dating from the 1880s are held in the Adventist Heritage Centre at Cooranbong. According to the Australian Department of the Environment and Heritage, "these rich and diverse records of provenance add to the significance of items in the museum."

Sunnyside Historic Home
This historic home was constructed by Seventh-day Adventist Church co-founder Ellen G. White and served as her home base for six years while she lived in Australia (1895–1900). It originally sat on 40 acres of land Mrs White bought from the church for $1,350 in an effort to provide needed funds for the school development.  The home was where she wrote significant portions of her most popular books, including the Desire of Ages, a work on the life of Christ. Ellen White was instrumental in founding Avondale College, and the home sits near the campus. It was bought by the Australasian (now South Pacific) Division in 1960, and they restored Sunnyside. The home is available for tours.

Education
Cooranbong Public School (P-6, public)
Avondale School (P-12, private Christian)
Avondale College (University level degrees, private Christian)

Demographics 
According to the 2016 census of Population, there were 5,449 people in Cooranbong.
 The median age of Cooranbong residents was 43 years, compared with 38 years as the News South Wales median.
 77.7% of people were born in Australia. The next most common countries of birth were New Zealand 4.6% and England 2.5%.   
 88.3% of people spoke only English at home. 
 The most common responses for religion were Seventh-day Adventist 30.8%, No Religion 19.1%, Anglican 13.7% and Catholic 10.8%.
 The median weekly household income was $1,232.

Notable residents
 Lindy Chamberlain (born 1948), known for her famous trial, being erroneously accused of killing her nine-week-old daughter, Azaria, while camping at Ayers Rock in 1980.
 Michael Chamberlain (1944–2017), ex-husband of Lindy, erroneously accused of being accessory in the death of Azaria, pastor, teacher, writer.
 Elsa Klensch (1930–2022) fashion journalist and television presenter (Style with Elsa Klensch) born in Cooranbong.

References

Further reading
 Cooranbong, First Town in Lake Macquarie, 1826–1996: A History Including Martinsville and Dora Creek by Michael Chamberlain (description).

External links

History of Cooranbong
Cooranbong Community School
Avondale College
Avondale Memorial Seventh-day Adventist Church
Avondale School (K-12)

Suburbs of Lake Macquarie
Towns in the Hunter Region
1826 establishments in Australia
Towns in New South Wales